Tule Desert may refer to:

Tule Desert (Arizona)
Tule Desert (Nevada)